Abval-e Abbasabad (also Romanized as Ābvāl-e ‘Abbāsābād; also known as ‘Abbāsābād) is a village in Kuhpayeh Rural District, in the Central District of Kashan County, Isfahan Province, Iran. At the 2006 census, its population was 16, in 6 families.

References 

Populated places in Kashan County